Hamilton is a city in and the county seat of Hamilton County, Texas, United States, located in the state's central region. Its population was 3,095 at the 2010 census.

Geography

Hamilton is located in central Hamilton County at  (31.703274, –98.120359). U.S. Route 281 passes through the center of the city, leading north  to Hico and south  to Evant. Texas State Highway 22 leads northeast from Hamilton  to Meridian.

The city is drained by Pecan Creek, an east-flowing tributary of the Leon River.

Demographics

2020 census

As of the 2020 United States census, 2,895 people, 968 households, and 632 families were residing in the city.

2010 census
As of the census of 2010,  3,095 people, 1,230 households, and 777 families were residing in the city. The population density was 1,067.2 people/sq mi (412.7/km2). The 1,470 housing units averaged 506.9/sq mi (196 per km2). The racial makeup of the city was 94.5% White, 0.7% African American, 0.7% Native American, 0.5% Asian, 2.8%  from other races, and 0.8% from two or more races. Hispanics or Latinos of any race were 8.9% of the population.

Of the 1,230 households,  26.9% had children under 18 living with them, 45.7% were married couples living together, 13.3% had a female householder with no husband present, 4.1% had a male householder with no wife present, and 36.8% were not families. About 32.1% of all households were made up of individuals, and 17.6% had someone living alone who was 65 years of age or older. The average household size was 2.38, and the average family size was 2.92.

In the city, the age distribution was 21.8% under  18, 27.9% from 18 to 44, 23.9% from 45 to 64, and 26.4% who were 65  or older. The median age was 45.2 years. For every 100 females, there were 86.4 males. For every 100 females age 18 and over, there were 82.2 males.

The median income for a household in the city was $26,585, and for a family was $38,702. Males had a median income of $27,074 versus $17,500 for females. The per capita income for the city was $15,012. About 12.2% of families and 15.9% of the population were below the poverty line, including 23.0% of those under age 18 and 16.1% of those age 65 or over.

Education
The city is served by the Hamilton Independent School District.

Landmarks
The Hamilton County Courthouse, built in 1897, was added to the National Register of Historic Places in April 1980.

Notable people

 Mark Harelik, actor and playwright, was born and raised in Hamilton.
 Louise Latham, actress, was born and raised in Hamilton.
 Brushy Bill, the man who claimed to be  infamous outlaw Billy the Kid, died in Hico, and is buried in Hamilton.

Transportation
Hamilton is home to Hamilton Municipal Airport, a city-owned, public-use airport located at the south edge of the city.

Major highways
 U.S. Route 281 is the largest highway and main north–south route through Hamilton. US 281 runs from the Mexico–US border in the south to the Canada–US border in the north.
 Texas State Highway 36 runs through Hamilton on a generally east–west axis on its way between Abilene to the northwest and Freeport to the southeast.
 Texas State Highway 22 reaches its western terminus within the city limits of Hamilton at its junction with State Highway 36 near the eastern edge of the city. State Highway 22 runs east from Hamilton to Corsicana.

Climate
The climate in this area is characterized by hot, humid summers and generally mild to cool winters.  According to the Köppen climate classification, Hamilton has a humid subtropical climate, Cfa on climate maps.

References

External links

 City of Hamilton official website

Cities in Hamilton County, Texas
Cities in Texas
County seats in Texas